The Coast Oregon Penutian languages are a proposed family of three small languages or language clusters on the Oregon Coast that has moderate support. Although much of their similarity is demonstrably due to language contact, linguists such as Scott DeLancey believe they may be genealogically related at a greater time depth. They are part of the much more hypothetical Penutian proposal.

Coast Oregon Penutian languages

The Coast Oregon Penutian languages are:

 Alsean
 Yaquina, spoken on the central Oregon coast around Yaquina Bay & along the Yaquina River (central Oregon coast) by the Yaquina people
Alsea, spoken on the central Oregon coast around Alsea Bay and along the Alsea and Yachats rivers by the Alsea people
 Siuslaw
Siuslaw dialect spoken on the central Oregon coast along the Siuslaw River and around Siltcoos Lake
Kuitsh dialect spoken on the central Oregon coast around Winchester Bay and along the lower Umpqua and Smith rivers.
 Coosan
possibly several Hanis dialects spoken along the southern Oregon coast in the vicinity of Coos Bay and along the Coos River.
possibly one or two Miluk dialects spoken along the southern Oregon coast around South Slough of Coos Bay and along the lower Coquille River.

All Coast Oregon Penutian languages became extinct in the 20th century.

References

 
Penutian languages
Indigenous languages of the Pacific Northwest Coast
Indigenous languages of Oregon
Coast Oregon